Armando Gorbea, better known as Tommy Diablo, is a professional wrestler (currently inactive) better known for wrestling in both the International Wrestling Association in Puerto Rico and the World Wrestling Council, where he is a fifteen-time WWC World Junior Heavyweight Champion.

Professional career

Debut and International Wrestling Association (2000–2002)
In 2000 Tommy Diablo made his professional debut in the International Wrestling Association of Puerto Rico. His first notable feud was against Andy Anderson and Tiger Ali Singh, during this angle he teamed up with Steve Bradley. The feud was part of Club WWF a weekly television program transmitted on Telemundo. He spent a period of two years feuding with the Junior Heavyweight wrestlers as well as the company’s young talent. During this time frame he would win his first professional championship, the IWA Junior Heavyweight Title. He held the title for one week before losing it against Paparazzi. He had feuds with Diabólico, Anarchy, Paparazzi and Eric Alexander.

World Wrestling Council (2002–2003)
Diablo left the IWA and debuted on the World Wrestling Council during 2002. He was involved in a feud against Eddie Colón over the WWC Junior Heavyweight championship. He would fail to acquire the title for Colon. When Colon was defeated in a title match against Kid Kash, Diablo would develop a feud for the title. He won the WWC Junior Heavyweight championship on December 14, 2002. He won the title against Brent Dáil in a match to determine a new champion after the title was vacated by Kash. He teamed with Wilfredo Alejandro in an angle where he would attempt to unmask a wrestler that was playing mind games with him. Tommy Diablo was part of La Invasion Dominicana a heel faction led by El Bronco and Chicky Starr.

International Wrestling Association (2003–2007)
Diablo would make a return to the International Wrestling Association in 2003. He was involved in an angle in which he helped Paparazzi in a feud with Stefano, this angle lasted through fall. On September 20, 2003 he won his second IWA Junior Heavyweight title by defeating Noriega. He had a feud with fellow cruiserweight wrestler Blitz, winning the title a third time from him. On October 30, 2004 he lost the title in a match against Golden Boy. He was involved in an angle in which he was (kayfabe) gravely injured by Apolo, he was out of action until early 2005. He was involved in a feud with Super Mark eventually defeating him for Junior Heavyweight title on May 21, 2005 in Toa Baja, Puerto Rico. He defended his title successfully against Carlito numerous times, and held it until Carlitos defeated him on October 1, 2005. He would have taken part in an angle involving several cruiserweight wrestler including Blitz, Carlitos and Hiram Tua. He is currently the leader of a stable of young heel superstars consisting of Super Mark, Cruzz and GQ the ravishing. He won the newly created IWA Cruiserweight championship by defeating Blitz on March 4, 2007 in Guanica, Puerto Rico.

World Wrestling Council (2008–2017)
Tommy Diablo returned to WWC in 2008 and immediately he was involved in a feud with BJ. On August 9 he won the WWC Puerto Rico Heavyweight Championship after beating BJ thanks to his associate Aquiles. On December 13, at Lockout he lost the title against BJ in a ladder match. He later became a member of the heel group 'La familia 'with El Bronco, Steve Corino, Charles Evans and other superstars.

He gained the WWC Junior Heavyweight Championship at February 27, 2010 by defeating Rikochet at the event Noche de Campeones.

In 2014 he won the WWC Junior Heavyweight Championship by defeating his former best friend Angel Fashion to become a 9 times champion. On September 7, 2014 at Septiembre Negro, Fashion defeated Diablo in a title match. Also, per the stipulations of the match, Diablo became a referee. On January 9, 2016, Diablo defeated Peter Romance to become an 11 times Junior Heavyweight champion.

AAA (2014)
On August he traveled to Mexico promotion AAA with El Sesancional Carlitos to enter a fatal 4 way eliminating for the AAA World Tag Team Titles they fight till be the last 4 but been defeated by the current champions Angélico & Jack Evans

Championships and accomplishments
International Wrestling Association
IWA Hardcore Championship (3 times) 
IWA Cruiserweight Championship (1 time)
IWA Junior Heavyweight Championship (6 times)
Lucha Xtrema Nacional de Panamá
LXN Tag Team Championship (2 times) - with Juventud Guerrera and Gran Tonka
World Wrestling Council
WWC World Junior Heavyweight Championship (17 times)
WWC Puerto Rico Championship (1 time)
WWC World Tag Team Championship (2 times) - with Johnny Ringo (1) and Cuervo (1)

See also
Professional wrestling in Puerto Rico

References

Living people
People from Carolina, Puerto Rico
Professional wrestling executives
Puerto Rican male professional wrestlers
Year of birth missing (living people)
21st-century professional wrestlers
WWC Puerto Rico Champions